Lalitha Kumari (born 18 May 1967) is an Indian actress who worked in Tamil films. She is the daughter of Tamil actor C. L. Anandan and the younger sister of actress Disco Shanti.

Personal life
Lalitha Kumari married actor Prakash Raj in 1994 and the couple has two daughters and a son (who died in 2004). The couple have got divorced in 2009.

Career life
Lalitha Kumari starred in many movies, alongside the likes of Goundamani, Senthil and other senior actors. She has also played major roles in films such as Manadhil Urudhi Vendum, Pudhu Pudhu Arthangal, Pulan Visaranai and Sigaram. Lalitha Kumari has performed around 30 films and has made her mark in the Tamil film industry. In 1995, after her marriage to actor Prakash Raj, Kumari left the film industry.

She made her re-entry into Kollywood and South Indian cinema in the Tamil movie Muriyadi, playing the wife of Sathyaraj's character. However the film was, and as of July 2022 still is, shelved and delayed due to unknown reasons.

Partial filmography

References

External links 
 
 

Actresses in Tamil cinema
Living people
Place of birth missing (living people)
20th-century Indian actresses
Indian film actresses
1972 births